Homebake is a slang name used in New Zealand and Australia for morphine produced from codeine when it is difficult to obtain heroin.

References

Opioids
Drug culture